Year 1078 (MLXXVIII) was a common year starting on Monday (link will display the full calendar) of the Julian calendar.

Events 
 By place 

 Byzantine Empire 
 Spring – Nikephoros Botaneiates, a Byzantine general (strategos) of the Theme of the Anatolics, revolts against Emperor Michael VII (Doukas). With the support of the Seljuk Turks who provide him with troops, Nikephoros marches upon Nicaea (modern Turkey). He defeats the imperial army and proclaims himself emperor.
 March 24 – Nikephoros Botaneiates enters Constantinople in triumph and is crowned by Patriarch Cosmas I as emperor Nikephoros III of the Byzantine Empire. Michael VII resigns his throne after a 7-year reign and retires into the Monastery of Stoudios.
 Battle of Kalavrye: The imperial forces of General Alexios Komnenos are victorious over the rebellious army (12,000 men) under Nikephoros Bryennios (the Elder), governor (doux) of the Theme of Dyrrhachium. Bryennios is captured and later blinded.
 Philaretos Brachamios abandons his claim to the Byzantine throne, on being appointed governor of Antioch, a foundation of the later Armenian Kingdom of Cilicia.

 Europe 
 August 7 – Battle of Mellrichstadt: Emperor Henry IV defeats the German anti-king Rudolf of Rheinfelden, duke of Swabia, near Mellrichstadt (modern Germany).
 October 3 – Grand Prince Iziaslav I dies, and is succeeded by Vsevolod I, who unites the principalities – Kiev, Chernigov and Pereyaslavl – in Kievan Rus'.

 England 
 The White Tower of the Tower of London is begun, under the direction of Gundulf (or Gundulph), bishop of Rochester (approximate date).

 Africa 
 The Almoravid emir, Yusuf ibn Tashfin, besieges Ceuta. Since the city can receive help from the sea, the siege will last until 1083.

 China 
 By this year, the iron industry in the Song Dynasty is producing a total weight of 127,000,000 kg (125,000 t) of iron product per year.

 By topic 

 Religion 
 July 11 – The Romanesque tympanum of Santiago de Compostela Cathedral in Galicia (modern Spain) is constructed.
 Anselm is elected abbot of Bec Abbey, in Normandy.
 A church council in Poitiers deposes Bishop Sylvester of Rennes who had bought his office in 1076. This leads also to the flight of Robert of Arbrissel to Paris where he begins his studies.

Births 
 March 17 – Abdul Qadir Gilani, Persian preacher (d. 1166)
 Alexander I (the Fierce), king of Scotland (d. 1124)
 Al-Mustazhir, Abbasid caliph in Baghdad (d. 1118)
 Constance of France, princess of Antioch (d. 1125)
 Ermengol V, count of Urgell (Catalonia) (d. 1102)
 Fujiwara no Tadazane, Japanese nobleman (d. 1162)
 Ibn Quzman, Moorish poet and writer (d. 1160)
 Reishi, Japanese empress consort (d. 1144)

Deaths 
 February 20 – Herman, bishop of Salisbury 
 May 30 – Gleb Svyatoslavich, Kievan prince 
 August 9 – Peter I, Italian nobleman
 August 26 – Herluin, founder of Bec Abbey
 October 3 
 Boris Vyacheslavich, prince of Chernigov 
 Iziaslav I, Grand Prince of Kiev (b. 1024)
 November 6 – Berthold II, duke of Carinthia
 November 11 – Udo, archbishop of Trier 
 Abd al-Qahir al-Jurjani, Persian scholar
 Andreas (or Andrew), archbishop of Bari
 Atsiz ibn Uvaq, Turkish emir of Damascus (or 1079)
 Immilla of Turin, Italian noblewoman
 Mu'ayyad fi'l-Din al-Shirazi, Fatimid scholar (b. 1000)
 Nikephoritzes, Byzantine governor
 Rhys ab Owain, king of Deheubarth 
 Richard I (Drengot), prince of Capua
 Tunka Manin, ruler of the Ghana Empire (b. 1010)
 Zeng Gongliang, Chinese scholar and writer (b. 998)
 Zhang Xian, Chinese poet and writer (b. 990)

References